Taal, officially the Municipality of Taal,  is a 3rd class municipality in the province of Batangas, Philippines. According to the 2020 census, it has a population of 61,460 people.

Taal is famous for its old ancestral houses, one particular ancestral house (now a museum) where Marcela Coronel Mariño de Agoncillo grew up in Taal, Batangas built in the 1770s by her grandparents, Don Andres Sauza Mariño and Doña Eugenia Diokno Mariño, (added by Slavstan Mariño). Its poblacion (central business district) is designated as a National Historical Landmark. The municipality is known as the Balisong and Barong Tagalog Capital of the Philippines. The town is home to hundreds of heritage structures dating from the Spanish colonial period. Scholars have been pushing for its inclusion in the UNESCO World Heritage List.

History 

The town of Taal was founded by Augustinian friars in 1572. In 1575, the town transferred later to the edge of Domingo lake, now Taal Lake in 1575. In 1754, Taal Volcano erupted endangering the town of Taal which stood at present day San Nicolas. Threatened by the new danger, the townspeople, together with the Augustinian Francisco Benchucillo, sought refuge in the sanctuary of Caysasay.

In 1955 the northern barrios of San Nicolas, Gipit, Bangin, Pansipit, Calangay, Sinturisan, Talang, Abilo, Balete, Bancora, Saimsim, Maabud, Mulawin, Tambo, Calumala, Alasas, Calawit, and Pulangbato were separated from Taal and formed into the municipality of San Nicolas.

Geography 
According to the Philippine Statistics Authority, the municipality has a land area of  constituting  of the  total area of Batangas.

Pansipit is one of the major ecological highways that allow migration of two fish species:  maliputo (Cranx ignobilis) and muslo (Cranx marginalis) which are unique to lake Taal. Adult fish migrate to the sea from Taal Lake via Pansipit River and Palanas River in Lemery. The tawilis (Harengula tawilis) is a freshwater sardine also endemic to Taal lake.

Climate

Taal has two seasons: dry from November to April, and wet during the rest of the year. The lowest minimum temperature does not drop below  while the highest maximum temperature of  occurs from March to July of each year.

Barangays
Taal is politically subdivided into 42 barangays.

Demographics

In the 2020 census, Taal had a population of 61,460.

The first census in 1903 recorded a total population of 17,525.  The 2007 population was 51,459 growing at 2.44% annually over the previous 7 years, with 7,961 households. By 2010, the population slightly increased to 51,503.

Economy

Cultural events 
 The EL PASUBAT Festival, celebrated annually during the month of April, is the conglomeration of the trademarks of Taal. "EL PASUBAT" stands for Empanada, Longganisa, Panutsa, Suman, Balisong, Barong Tagalog, Tapa, Tamales, Tawilis, Tulingan — the delicacies and crafts that Taal is known for.
 The Feast of St. Martin of Tours is held November 11 every year. Celebrations are in the form of prayer, hymns, declamation, flower offerings and big religious processions. Most families celebrate with food and drinks for visitors thereafter.
 The Feast of Our Lady of Caysasay, the well-known miraculous image of the Immaculate Conception, is celebrated every December 8. A joint town fiesta celebrated on December 9 honoring both Our Lady of Caysasay and Saint Martin of Tours.
 Lua is a traditional declamation in the vernacular recited by a maiden to honor the Virgin Mary or a boy in praise of a male saint like Saint Martin of Tours. In the procession, young girls and ladies in their pretty gowns make up the hila (pull), so called because they are supposed to pull the cord of lights originating from the Virgin's karosa (procession carriage) bedecked with flowers.

Local products and delicacies 

Since the Spanish period, the people of Taal lived by farming and commerce. The main produce are cotton, cacao and sugar which are made through the use of crude sugar mill called trapeche. Weaving and embroidery of barong and camisa (blouses) made from piña are popular home industries. Local embroidery businesses later expanded their products to include curtains, piano covers, pillowcases, tablecloth, table napkins and bed covers, adding more fame already earned by Taal embroidery.

Other products produced in the town are balisongs (butterfly knife) and various food treats such as the panocha (peanut brittle candy) and suman salehiya (a sweet suman), tapa (cured pork product) and the local longganisa, all of which are available at the public market. Popular Filipino dishes that originated from Taal are Adobo sa Dilaw (Yellow Adobo) and Sinaing na Tulingan (Bonita Fish Soup).

Notable personalities

Philippine Revolution

 Gliceria de Villavicencio was named as the “godmother of the revolutionary forces” by Gen. Emilio Aguinaldo. She supported the revolution against the Spaniards, and later the Americans inflamed by the death of her husband, Eulalio Villavicencio, in February 1898.
 Felipe Agoncillo is a revolutionary hero, statesman, and diplomat Philippine Republic to the United States and to the Treaty of Paris in 1898.
Doña Marcela Mariño de Agoncillo is best known as "The Mother of the Philippine Flag", (added by Slavstan Mariño), the maker of the present flag of the Philippines, first unfurled at the declaration of Philippine Independence on June 12, 1898, in Kawit, Cavite.
 Vicente Ilustre was associated with other Filipinos like Rizal, Plaridel, Galicano Apacible, and others in Spain. He became a member of the Philippine Commission under Gov. Gen. Francis Burton Harrison where he served as president of the committee for Mindanao and Sulu. Thereafter, he became a Senator in the First Senate of the Philippines. He was also instrumental in the installation of public light and water utilities in Taal.
 Ananías Diokno was the only Tagalog general to lead a full-scale military expedition to the Visayas against the Spanish forces. He became governor of Capiz.
 Galicano Apacible, was a co-founder of La Solidaridad with her cousin Rizal. He later co-founded the Nacionalista Party.

Modern Taaleños
 Ramón Diokno, Senator and Supreme Court Justice
 Jose W. Diokno, Senator and Secretary of Justice. The Sangguniang Bayan meets at the Sen. Jose W. Diokno Legislative Hall at the Municipal Hall.
 Father Fernando Suarez, a Catholic priest known worldwide for faith healing, was born here in 1967.
 Benjamin Diokno - Secretary of Budget and Management 1998–2001, 2016–2019; Governor of Bangko Sentral ng Pilipinas 2019–2022; Secretary of Finance 2022-present

Gallery

See also 
 Basilica de San Martin de Tours (Taal) – the biggest Catholic Basilica Church in the Far East
 Our Lady of Caysasay
 Our Lady of Caysasay Academy

References

External links 

 
 Official Tourism Website of Taal
 [ Philippine Standard Geographic Code]

 
Municipalities of Batangas
Former provincial capitals of the Philippines